"Pale Moon" (An Indian Love Song) is a popular song composed by Frederic Knight Logan with lyrics by Jesse G. M. Glick. The song was written in 1920.

Notable recordings
Probably one of the earliest recordings was by Lucy Isabelle Marsh.

Paul Whiteman's version - recorded April 8, 1924 (Victor 19345) was very popular in 1924.

Bing Crosby and The Merry Macs recorded the song on December 23, 1940 with Bob Crosby's Bob Cats.

Frank Sinatra recorded a version with the Tommy Dorsey Orchestra on August 19, 1941.

Jimmy Wakely (1952) and Tex Williams also recorded popular Western and Western Swing versions.

Lyrics
The lyrics as published:

References

Bibliography
Glick, Jesse G.M. (w.); Logan, Frederic Knight (m.). "Pale Moon (An Indian Love Song)." Chicago: Forster Music Publisher, Inc. (1920).

1920 songs
Western music (North America)
Western swing songs